Enispe or the caliphs is a genus of nymphalid butterfly in the subfamily Morphinae. They are found in western China and from Sikkim to Borneo.

Species
Enispe cycnus Westwood, 1851
Enispe euthymius (Doubleday, 1845)
Enispe intermedia Rothschild, 1916
Enispe lunatus Leech, 1891 western China (Sichuan), eastern Tibet. 
Enispe milvus Staudinger, [1897] northern Borneo

References

External links
images representing Enispe  at Consortium for the Barcode of Life

Amathusiini
Nymphalidae genera
Taxa named by Edward Doubleday